Cheri E. Steinmetz is an American politician and a Republican member of the Wyoming Senate representing District 3 since January 7, 2019. She previously served in the Wyoming House of Representatives representing District 5 from 2015-2019.

Elections

2014
Steinmetz challenged incumbent Republican Representative Matt Teeters, who had previously served as House Majority Whip.  Teeters co-authored Senate File 104 in 2013, which removed many constitutional powers provided to the Wyoming Superintendent of Public Instruction.  This proved to be unpopular with constituents, and Steinmetz defeated Teeters in the Republican primary, 60% to 40%.  She was then unopposed in the general election.

2016
Steinmetz ran unopposed in both the primary and general elections.

2018
When incumbent Republican Senator Curt Meier retired to run for State Treasurer, Steinmetz declared her candidacy for the State Senate. Steinmetz defeated Martin Gubbels in the Republican primary with 71.1% of the vote, and defeated Democratic candidate Marci Shaver with 79.6% of the vote.

Politics
In February 2022, Steinmetz wrote a budget amendment to eliminate University of Wyoming Gender Studies program.

References

External links
Official page at the Wyoming Legislature
Profile from Ballotpedia

Living people
Republican Party members of the Wyoming House of Representatives
Republican Party Wyoming state senators
People from Lingle, Wyoming
21st-century American politicians
Year of birth missing (living people)
21st-century American women politicians
Women state legislators in Wyoming